Charles B. Davis (March 9, 1877 – March 3, 1943) was a United States district judge of the United States District Court for the Eastern District of Missouri.

Education and career

Born in Hannibal, Missouri, Davis received an Artium Baccalaureus degree from the University of Missouri in 1902 and a Bachelor of Laws from the University of Missouri School of Law in 1905. He was in private practice in St. Louis, Missouri from 1905 to 1909. He was an assistant circuit attorney in St. Louis from 1909 to 1912, returning to private practice from 1912 to 1914, then serving as an associate city counselor for St. Louis from 1914 to 1915. Davis was a Judge of the Circuit Court of Missouri from 1916 to 1924.

Federal judicial service

On January 21, 1924, Davis was nominated by President Calvin Coolidge to a new seat on the United States District Court for the Eastern District of Missouri created by 42 Stat. 837. He was confirmed by the United States Senate on January 31, 1924, and received his commission the same day. Davis served in that capacity until his death on March 3, 1943, in Hot Springs, Arkansas.

References

Sources
 

1877 births
1943 deaths
Missouri state court judges
Judges of the United States District Court for the Eastern District of Missouri
United States district court judges appointed by Calvin Coolidge
20th-century American judges